A. S. Rao Nagar, also known as Dr. A. S. Rao Nagar, is a major commercial and residential neighbourhood of Hyderabad, Telangana, India. It is located in the north eastern side of the city falling under Kapra Village & Mandal , Medchal-Malkajgiri district. It is administered as Ward No. 2 of Greater Hyderabad Municipal Corporation.

In 2012 A. S. Rao Nagar's high street area had the steepest hike in rental prices across the country. It has many residential townships like Saket which is near suburbs including Neredmet, ECIL, Sainikpuri and Moula-Ali.

History
It is named after Dr. Ayyagari Sambasiva Rao (Dr. A.S.Rao), the founder of the Electronics Corporation of India (ECIL) in Hyderabad. He was instrumental in forming ECIL Employees Co-Operative House Construction Society Limited in 1976, for the benefit of the employees of Department of Atomic Energy, ECIL, NFC and TIFR.

Economy
Many specialist retail outlets and commercial buildings have their establishments in the area.

Transport
The neighbourhood is well connected to different parts of the cities. Many TSRTC buses operate from the area. The nearest local train station is R. K. Puram Railway Station and Moula-Ali. The suburb is well connected to Ghatkesar, ECIL, Neredmet, Keesara, Sainikpuri and Malkajgiri.

References 

Neighbourhoods in Hyderabad, India
Municipal wards of Hyderabad, India